Huangtazui Town(), is an urban town in Liling City, Zhuzhou City, Hunan Province, People's Republic of China.

Cityscape
The town is divided into 9 villages and 2 communities, the following areas: Huangtazui Community, Shechong Community, Longxing'ao Village, Jinji Village, Shixingshan Village, Taizhou Village, Dawan Village, Shuangjing Village, Yangjialong Village, Jiaoyuan Village, and Zhubaozhang Village.

References

Historic township-level divisions of Liling